Faro do Alentejo is a Portuguese civil parish (Freguesia) within the municipality of Cuba. The population in 2011 was 741, in an area of 44.68 km2.

It also used to be known as Farinho (which in Portuguese means "small Faro").

References

Parishes of Cuba, Portugal